Nino Pungaršek (born 1 November 1995) is a Slovenian football player who plays as a midfielder.

Honours
Celje
Slovenian PrvaLiga: 2019–20

Olimpija Ljubljana
Slovenian Cup: 2020–21

References

External links
NZS profile 

1995 births
Living people
Slovenian footballers
Slovenia youth international footballers
Association football midfielders
NK Celje players
NK Šmartno 1928 players
NK Bravo players
NK Olimpija Ljubljana (2005) players
Slovenian PrvaLiga players
Slovenian Second League players